Euwallacea piceus, is a species of weevil native to Oriental Asia but introduced to African and other Westerns Pacific parts of the world. It is a serious pest in tropical and subtropical parts of the Americas.

Distribution
The native range of the species is Bangladesh, India, Indonesia, Japan, Malaysia, Philippines, Sri Lanka, Taiwan, Vietnam, Australia, Papua New Guinea, and Solomon Islands. The introduced range of the beetle is in African countries: Angola, Cameroon, Democratic Republic of the Congo, Côte d'Ivoire, Equatorial Guinea, Ghana, Guinea, Kenya, Madagascar, Nigeria, Seychelles, South Africa, Tanzania, Uganda, American Samoa, Micronesia, Fiji, New Caledonia, Samoa and Vanuatu.

Description
Adult female has described as follows: average length is about 2.1 to 2.3 mm. Frons convex, shiny and finely reticulate. Frons with large, scattered, deep punctures and scattered, long, erect setae. Pronotal sides are weakly arcuate, and serrations are absent. Elytra longer than pronotum. Elytral apex broadly rounded with unimpressed striae. There are small, shallow punctures on elytra. Elytral interstriae are slightly wider than striae. Elytral declivity is sloping, and weakly convex.

Biology
It is considered as a high-risk quarantine pest. They show inbreeding, with the males generally mating with their sisters within the parental gallery system before dispersal. Attacked plants show signs of wilting, and branch die-back during initial stages, and later resulting shoot breakage, chronic debilitation, and sometimes sun-scorch.

A polyphagous species, it is observed from wide range of host plants. They attack any woody material with abundant moisture content.

Host plants
 Artocarpus altilis
 Artocarpus heterophyllus
 Castilla elastica
 Celtis mildbraedii 
 Diospyros pyrrhocarpa
 Dipterocarpus
 Endospermum diadenum
 Erythrina subumbrans
 Ficus
 Gmelina arborea
 Khaya ivorensis
 Koompassia malaccensis
 Milicia excelsa
 Podocarpus
 Pometia pinnata
 Pterygota alata
 Tectona grandis
 Terminalia ivorensis
 Triplochiton scleroxylon

References 

Curculionidae
Insects of Sri Lanka
Beetles described in 1863